Keeper of the Records can refer to:

 Keeper of the Records of Scotland, the head of the National Archives of Scotland
 Lyon Clerk and Keeper of the Records, a post within the Court of the Lord Lyon, responsible for maintaining the Public Register of All Arms and Bearings in Scotland
 Secretary and Keeper of the Records, the chief executive of the Duchy of Cornwall

Northern Ireland  
 Keeper of the Records, a title held by the Minister for Culture, Arts and Leisure
 Deputy Keeper of the Records, the Director of the Public Record Office of Northern Ireland

See also
 Deputy Keeper of the Records or Keeper of Public Records, the chief executive of the Public Record Office
 Keeper of the Archives, a position at the University of Oxford
 List of Keepers of the Records in the Tower of London, an obsolete title